Carinodrillia fermori is an extinct species of sea snail, a marine gastropod mollusk in the family Pseudomelatomidae, the turrids and allies.

Distribution
This extinct species occurs in Miocene strata in the Quilon Formation, Kerala, India; age range: 23.03 to 15.97 Ma

References

 A. K. Dey. 1961. The Miocene Mollusca from Quilon, Kerala (India). Palaeontologica Indica 36

External links
 Worldwide Mollusc Species Data Base : Carinodrillia fermori

fermori
Gastropods described in 1961